The 1974–75 Cupa României was the 37th edition of Romania's most prestigious football cup competition.

The title was won by Rapid București against Universitatea Craiova.

Format
The competition is an annual knockout tournament.

First round proper matches are played on the ground of the lowest ranked team, then from the second round proper the matches are played on a neutral location.

If a match is drawn after 90 minutes, the game goes in extra time, and if the scored is still tight after 120 minutes, then the winner will be established at penalty kicks.

From the first edition, the teams from Divizia A entered in competition in sixteen finals, rule which remained till today.

Bracket

First round proper

|colspan=3 style="background-color:#FFCCCC;"|13 November 1974

|}

Second round proper

|colspan=3 style="background-color:#FFCCCC;"|27 November 1974

|}

Quarter-finals

|colspan=3 style="background-color:#FFCCCC;"|11 December 1974

|}

Semi-finals

|colspan=3 style="background-color:#FFCCCC;"|25 June 1975

|}

Final

References

External links
 romaniansoccer.ro
 Official site
 The Romanian Cup on the FRF's official site

Cupa României seasons
1974–75 in Romanian football
Romania